Li Hui (born 1953) is a Chinese diplomat.
He was the Chinese Ambassador to Russia, presenting his credentials to Russian President Dmitry Medvedev on 16 December 2009. He was appointed by the then Chinese President Hu Jintao on 13 August 2009, succeeding Liu Guchang.
Li was previously Vice Foreign Minister of China. He was replaced as ambassador to Russia on 10 August 2019.

References

Ambassadors of China to Russia
1953 births
Living people
Ambassadors of China to Kazakhstan